Clara Direz (born 5 April 1995) is a French World Cup alpine ski racer, a giant slalom specialist.

Career
In January 2013, Direz made her World Cup debut in the Giant Slalom at Maribor, Slovenia. In January 2020, she scored her first World Cup win and achieved her first podium in the Parallel Giant Slalom in Sestriere, Italy.

World Cup results

Season standings

Race podiums
 1 podium (1 PG)

References

External links

1995 births
Living people
French female alpine skiers
Youth Olympic gold medalists for France
Alpine skiers at the 2012 Winter Youth Olympics
Alpine skiers at the 2022 Winter Olympics
Olympic alpine skiers of France